The Laurence Olivier Award for Outstanding Achievement in an Affiliate Theatre is an annual award presented by the Society of London Theatre in recognition of achievements in commercial London theatre. The awards were established as the Society of West End Theatre Awards in 1976, and renamed in 1984 in honour of English actor and director Laurence Olivier.

This award, introduced in 2004, recognizes excellence in theatre works throughout London, beyond the West End theatres that are considered for all the original Olivier Awards. This award also includes works performed by junior companies, or in smaller rooms, within the traditional West End theatres.

Winners and nominees

2000s

2010s

2020s

References

External links
 

Laurence Olivier Awards